El Angosto is a village located in the Santa Catalina Department of Jujuy Province, Argentina.

Characteristics
The locality of El Angosto has the distinction of being the northernmost of all the towns in Argentina. The international jurisdictional change there is marked by the bed of San Juan del Oro River. The town is located next to a creek that discharges its runoff into the mentioned river, which belongs to the Río de la Plata Basin.

References 

Populated places in Jujuy Province